A submarine tender is a type of depot ship that supplies and supports submarines.

Development

Submarines are small compared to most oceangoing vessels, and generally do not have the ability to carry large amounts of food, fuel, torpedoes, and other supplies, nor to carry a full array of maintenance equipment and personnel. The tender carries all these, and either meets submarines at sea to replenish them or provides these services while docked at a port near the area where the submarines are operating. In some navies, the tenders were equipped with workshops for maintenance, and as floating dormitories with relief crews.

With the increased size and automation of modern submarines, plus in some navies the introduction of nuclear power, tenders are no longer as necessary for fuel as they once were.

Canada

Chile
The term used in the Chilean Navy is "submarine mother ship", as for example the BMS (buque madre de submarinos) Almirante Merino.

China
China's Type 926 submarine support ship is capable of replenishing submarines and rescuing those in distress.

Germany
Unable to operate a significant number of conventional surface tenders during World War II, Germany's Kriegsmarine used Type XIV submarines (nicknamed milk cows) for replenishment at sea.

Russia
The Russian Navy decommissioned all its Don and Ugra-class tenders inherited from the Soviet Navy by 2001. She was reportedly decommissioned in July 2006.

The Netherlands
Commissioned in 1956, as an ocean going Aggressive-class minesweeper, built in the US, and later used as a submarine tender.

United Kingdom
List of Royal Navy submarine depot ships

United States
 See main article:  List of US Navy submarine tenders 
In the United States Navy, submarine tenders are considered auxiliaries, with hull classification symbol "AS".

References

External links

Ship types